Peter Emmanuel Wright (c. 1880/81 – 1957) was a British writer.

He was born in Paris to a Yorkshire bookmaker and was educated at Harrow School. He won an Exhibition to Balliol College, Oxford when he was 16 and a full scholarship at 17. During the First World War he served as a captain in the Machine Gun Corps and as an assistant secretary to the Supreme War Council.

His 1921 book, At the Supreme War Council, detailed his experiences as an interpreter at the Supreme War Council. His 1924 work, The Shirt, was a collection of essays and stories. On 11 June 1925 his Portraits and Criticisms was published. This was a collection of character sketches which included H. H. Asquith, Margot Asquith and Lord Robert Cecil. In the essay on Cecil, Wright said of William Ewart Gladstone: "Gladstone...founded the great tradition since observed by many of his followers and successors with such pious fidelity, in public to speak the language of the highest and strictest principle, and in private to pursue and possess every sort of woman".

Gladstone's two surviving sons, Herbert and Henry Gladstone, wrote to Wright on 22 July 1925: "Your garbage about Mr. Gladstone in Portraits and Criticisms has come to our knowledge. You are a liar. Because you slander a dead man, you are a coward. Because you think that the public will accept invention from such as you, you are a fool". In a letter to Herbert Gladstone, the publishers (Eveleigh Nash and Grayson) claimed that the offending passage was inserted by Wright in the proof stage of printing. The Gladstones sent a copy of their letter to Wright to The Nation and Wright replied with a letter to the Daily Mail. On 27 July Herbert Gladstone complained to the Bath Club that Wright ("a liar, a coward, and a foul fellow") had written letters on the controversy to The Nation on Club notepaper, which led to Wright's expulsion (Wright had replied to an earlier criticism of the book in a letter to The Nation). Wright subsequently sued the Club for damages and Herbert Gladstone for libel for his 27 July letter.

After the trial, which lasted from 27 January to 3 February 1927, Wright was awarded £125 in damages from the Club for wrongful expulsion but he lost the libel case. The jury explained that "the gist of the defendant's letter of July 27 was true" and added that they were "of the unanimous opinion that the evidence which has been placed before us has completely vindicated the high moral character of the late Mr. W. E. Gladstone".

Works
 Internet Archive (sign in to view footnotes and reference sources) Link
 At The Supreme War Council (1921).
The Shirt (1924).
Portraits and Criticisms (1925).

Notes

1880s births
1957 deaths
People educated at Harrow School
Alumni of Balliol College, Oxford
British writers
British Army personnel of World War I
Machine Gun Corps officers
Military personnel from Paris